The LSU–Shreveport Pilots (or LSUS Pilots) are the athletic teams that represent Louisiana State University Shreveport, located in Shreveport, Louisiana, in intercollegiate sports as a member of the National Association of Intercollegiate Athletics (NAIA), primarily competing in the Red River Athletic Conference (RRAC) since the 2010–11 academic year. The Pilots previously competed in the Gulf Coast Athletic Conference (GCAC) from 2000–01 to 2009–10.

Accomplishments
The LSU–Shreveport athletic program has produced many championship teams collecting nine regular season conference titles, 16 conference tournament championships, and competed in 31 NAIA National Tournaments.

Varsity teams
LSUS competes in six intercollegiate varsity sports: Men's sports include baseball, basketball and soccer; while women's sports include basketball, soccer and tennis. Club sports include bass fighting, eSports and weightlifting.

Baseball
The LSU–Shreveport Pilots baseball team competes in NAIA Division I. The team held the nation's no. 1 ranking during their record year with a 54–6 record in 2012. The Pilots have been to the Avista-NAIA World series three times under former head coach Rocke Musgraves (2000-2013). Musgraves led the Pilots to a fourth-place finish (2011) and a pair of third-place finishes (2003 & 2012). 

 Conference Regular Season Titles: 2005, 2011, 2012, 2014
 Conference Tournament Titles: 1997, 2006, 2007, 2008, 2010, 2011, 2012, 2013, 2015, 2016, 2017
 NAIA Opening Round Appearances (Regional Tournaments): 2003, 2004, 2005, 2006, 2007, 2008, 2009, 2010, 2011, 2012, 2013, 2014, 2015, 2016, 2017
 NAIA Opening Round Titles: 2011, 2012
 Avista-NAIA World Series Appearances: 2003, 2011, 2012

The program has had multiple players sign professional contracts and drafted in the Major League Baseball Draft, including three taken in the 2010 MLB Draft.

Basketball

Men's
The LSU–Shreveport Pilots men's basketball team competes in NAIA Division I. It has become one the top teams in the NAIA since the program was re-instated in 2003. The Pilots have won four regular season titles, seven of the last eight conference tournaments and an even more impressive nine consecutive trips to the NAIA National Tournament in Kansas City. The Pilots have been to the elite eight twice and the Fab Four once.

 Conference Regular Season Titles: 2005, 2006, 2008, 2010, 2014
 Conference Tournament Titles: 2006, 2007, 2008, 2009, 2010, 2011, 2012, 2019
 NAIA National Tournament Appearances: 2005, 2006, 2007, 2008, 2009, 2010, 2011, 2012, 2013, 2014, 2015, 2016, 2017, 2018
 NAIA Fab Four Appearances: 2013
 NAIA Elite Eight Appearances: 2012, 2013

Women's
The LSU–Shreveport Pilots women's basketball team competes in NAIA Division I. Head coach Curtis Lloyd led the women's basketball team to their first RRAC Tournament Championship in his only season at the helm. National Championship Coach, Matt Cross, took over following Lloyd's departure for the 2017–18 season.

 Conference Tournament Titles: 2017
 Conference Tournament Appearances : 2005, 2006, 2007, 2008, 2009, 2010, 2011, 2012, 2013, 2014, 2015, 2016, 2017
 NAIA National Tournament Appearances: 2009, 2010, 2012, 2013, 2014, 2015, 2016, and 2017

Cross Country
The LSU–Shreveport men's and women's cross country teams competed in NAIA Division I.

Soccer
The LSU–Shreveport men's and women's soccer teams compete in NAIA Division I. The soccer program at LSUS began in 1992 with Norm Dolch as the head coach for the men's team. By 2005, women's soccer came on board under the direction of Coach Jed Jones. In 2013, the program was cut due to budget constraints enacted by the state. Both the men's and women's programs were reinstated 2017.

Men's
Men's Soccer: Head Coach Phillip Bohn

 Conference Tournament Appearances: 2009, 2010, 2012

Women's
Women's Soccer: Head Coach Ashley Holland 

 Conference Regular Season Championship: 2006
 Regional Tournament Qualifiers: 2005, 2007

Women's tennis
The LSU–Shreveport women's tennis team competes in the NAIA as an Independent.

Athletic facilities
Health and Physical Education BuildingThe Health and Physical Education Building on the campus of LSUS includes The Dock, a 1,000-seat gymnasium and home to the LSUS men's and women's basketball teams. The gymnasium is also used for high school basketball games, gymnastics meets and weightlifting competitions. The Health and Physical Education Building also includes the USA Weightlifting High Performance and Development Center which is home to the LSUS weightlifting team, the LSUS Natatorium that houses a six lane lap pool, five racquetball courts and an indoor track. Located adjacent to the building and part of the complex are eight tennis courts.

Pilot FieldPilot Field is a baseball stadium located on the campus of LSUS. It is home to the LSUS baseball team. It opened on February 17, 1994, and includes an indoor hitting facility, locker room, meeting room and coaches offices.

The SwampThe Swamp located on the campus of LSUS is the home of the men's and women's soccer teams. The facility includes a locker room for the teams.

Non-varsity/club sports

Bass Fishing
The bass fishing team at LSUS started in 2008, and it competes in the Collegiate Bass Fishing Association with its first competition at Lake Lewisville in Texas. 
 2nd Place in the 2011 National Guard FLW College Fishing National Championships
 2nd place in the 2016 Association of Collegiate Anglers Nationals 
 2nd place in the 2016 Carhartt Bassmaster Wildcard Collegiate Tournament
 5th place in the 2016 Bass Collegiate National Championship
 1st place in the 2017 Yeti College Tournament

Weightlifting
The weightlifting team at LSUS uses the USA Weightlifting Center for High Performance and Development, commissioned by the U.S. Olympic Committee on February 4, 1998, located in the Health and Physical Education building. The program is under the direction of Dr. Kyle Pierce, an associate professor of kinesiology at LSUS.

Notable team members are:

 Dawn List - set three Women's National Collegiate records for her weight class in 1991.
 Derrick Johnson - recipient of three junior national weightlifting records in 2004.
 Kendrick Farris - represented the U.S. in 2008, 2012, and 2016 at the Summer Olympics.

See also
 Red River Athletic Conference
 National Association of Intercollegiate Athletics

References

External links